Ernst Grawitz (18 March 1860, Mittelhagen, Kreis Greifenberg – 11 July 1911) was a German internist remembered for his work in the field of hematology. He was a younger brother of pathologist Paul Grawitz (1850-1932).

He studied medicine in Berlin, earning his degree in 1882. Following graduation, he served as a military physician, subsequently working as a prosector at the Augusta Hospital (Auguste-Viktoria-Klinikum) in Berlin (1886-1889). Afterwards, he was an assistant at the Berlin-Charité.

In 1890 he was habilitated for internal medicine, becoming an associate professor in 1897 as well as chief physician at the city hospital (Städtischen Krankenhaus) in Charlottenburg.

Principal works 
 Klinische Pathologie des Blutes, 1896 - Clinical pathology of the blood.
 Methodik der klinischen Blut-untersuchungen, 1902 - Methods for clinical blood tests.
 Hämatologie des praktischen Arztes, 1907 - Haematology for the practitioner.

References

External links
 

1860 births
1911 deaths
German hematologists